Wests may refer to:

Wests (drink), a New Zealand beverage manufacturer
Wests Panthers, an Australian rugby league football club based in Brisbane Western Suburbs
Wests Tigers, an Australian rugby league team in the NRL, from Inner West and Western Sydney
Western Suburbs Magpies, an Australian rugby league football club based in Sydney's Western Suburbs
Western Suburbs Rosellas, an Australian rugby league football club based in Newcastle's Western Suburbs

See also

 West (disambiguation)
 Western (disambiguation)